Aston Botterell is a civil parish in Shropshire, England.  It contains three listed buildings that are recorded in the National Heritage List for England.  Of these, two are listed at Grade II*, the middle of the three grades, and the other is at Grade II, the lowest grade.  The parish contains the small village of Aston Botterell and is otherwise completely rural.  The listed buildings consist of a church and two houses.


Key

Buildings

References

Citations

Sources

Lists of buildings and structures in Shropshire